Umm means mother in Arabic. It is a common Arabic feminine alias, and used to be a common feminine given name, with the masculine counterpart being Ab or Abu. The name may refer to:
Companions or other people related to the Islamic prophet Muhammad
Umm Anmaar
Umm al-Darda
Umm Ayman (Barakah)
Umm Hakim bint Abdul Muttalib
Umm ul-Banin
Umm Hakim
Umm Jamil
Umm al-Khair
Salma Umm-ul-Khair, mother of Abū Bakr, the first Caliph
Umm Kulthum bint Jarwal
Umm Ma'bad
Ibn Umm Maktūm
Umm Qirfa
Umm Ruman
Umm Sulaym bint Milham
Umm Shareek
Umm Ubays
Umm Waraqa

Other
Umm Darda as Sughra, 7th-century jurist and scholar of Islam in Damascus and Jerusalem
Umm Al-Kiram, 11th-century Andalusian princess and poet
Umm Kulthum (name)
Umm Nidal (born Maryam Mohammad Yousif Farhat, 1949-2013), Palestinian politician
Umm Al-Quwain, one of the seven constituent emirates of the United Arab Emirates
Umm-Salma (disambiguation)
Umm Sayyaf (born Nasrin As'ad Ibrahim), widow of ISIL member Abu Sayyaf killed in 2015

Arabic feminine given names